Pamwal Das Shiv Mandir at Pawaldass compound at Kakri Ground in Baghdadi area of Lyari Town. According to the Human Rights Commission of Pakistan and The News International Muslim clerics have illegally turned this centuries-old historic temple into a Muslim pir and slaughterhouse for cows with the help of Baghdadi police after making series of attacks on Hindu families living in the area.

See also

Hinduism in Pakistan
Swaminarayan
Swaminarayan Sampraday
Shri Varun Dev Mandir
 Evacuee Trust Property Board
 Pakistan Hindu Council
 Hinglaj Mata
 Kalat Kali Temple
 Katasraj temple 
 Multan Sun Temple
 Prahladpuri Temple, Multan
 Sadh Belo
 Shivaharkaray
 Shiv Mandir, Umerkot
 Tilla Jogian

References

Religious buildings and structures completed in 1849
Swaminarayan Sampradaya
Hindu temples in Karachi
1849 establishments in British India
Hinduism in Sindh
Heritage sites in Karachi